Evropos, known before 1925 as Ashiklar is a village and a former municipality in the former Paionia Province, Kilkis regional unit, Greece. Since the 2011 local government reform it is part of the municipality Paionia, of which it is a municipal unit. The municipal unit has an area of 80.922 km2. Population 4,518 (2011).

History

A sixth-century BC kouros found here is exhibited in the Archaeological Museum of Kilkis. Evropos is the homeland of Seleucus I Nicator.

References

Populated places in Kilkis (regional unit)